Heikant is a hamlet in the municipality of Loon op Zand, in the Dutch province of North Brabant. It is located about 3 km north of Loon op Zand.

Populated places in North Brabant
Loon op Zand